The Chicago Dogs are an independent professional baseball team based in Rosemont, Illinois. They are members of the American Association of Professional Baseball, an official Partner League of Major League Baseball. They began play in 2018 and play home games at the 6,300-seat Impact Field. The team's branding alludes to the Chicago-style hot dog, a local street food.

History

2018
In 2018, their first year as a team, the Dogs' manager was Butch Hobson. Former Chicago White Sox minor league pitcher Josh Goossen-Brown was the first player signed by the Chicago Dogs.  They finished the season in fourth place (out of six teams) in the American Association North Division, with a win–loss record of 45–54.

2019
In 2019, Carlos Zambrano joined the Dogs' roster.  Zambrano had pitched in the major leagues for 12 years, most of them as a member of the Chicago Cubs.  Butch Hobson continued to serve as the team's manager.  The Dogs finished the season in third place in the North Division, with a record of 59–40.

2020
In 2020, the Dogs competed as one of six league teams in a condensed 60-game season as a result of the COVID-19 pandemic. They were originally slated to play home games at Franklin Field (home of the Milwaukee Milkmen) due to capacity restrictions for outdoor events in Illinois. However, these restrictions were lifted on June 26 (as the state officially moved into Phase 4 of their reopening plan, allowing for outdoor spectator sports to resume at limited capacity) and thus enabled the Dogs to play all their home games at Impact Field.

Mascot

The mascot of the Chicago Dogs is Squeeze, a fuzzy yellow creature who resembles a squeeze bottle of mustard.

Season-by-season records

Roster

Notable alumni
 Joe Benson (2018)
 Scott Barnes (2018)
 Chad Girodo (2018)
 D. J. Snelten (2019)
 Carlos Zambrano (2019)
 Casey Crosby (2019–2020)
 Victor Roache (2019–2020)
 Tyler Ladendorf (2020)
 Joey Terdoslavich (2020)
 Eddie Butler (2020)
 Jamie Callahan (2020)
 Jake Cousins (2020)
 Eric Stout (2020)
 Michael Crouse (2020–2021)
 Anfernee Grier (2021)
 Michael Bowden (2021)
 Jonathon Crawford (2021)
 Connor Grey (2021)

References

External links

 
2018 establishments in Illinois
Baseball teams established in 2018